Isabel Truesdell Kelly (1906–1982) was an American anthropologist known for her work with the members of the Coast Miwok tribe, members of the Chemehuevi people in the 1920s and 1930s, and her work later in life as an archaeologist working in Sinaloa, Mexico.
She was trained by anthropologist Alfred L. Kroeber at the University of California, Berkeley.

Kelly was awarded Guggenheim Fellowships for the academic years 1940–1941 and 1941–1942.  In 1946 she was appointed Ethnologist-in-Charge of the Mexico city office of the Smithsonian Institution's Institute of Social Anthropology (ISA). She taught at the ISA and, with the assistance of students, did research among the Totonac in the Mexica state of Veracruz. The ISA was started in 1943 and disbanded at the end of 1952 — at that time Kelly and the ISA's other remaining anthropologists were transferred to the Institute of Inter-American affairs.

Her papers are on file today in the DeGolyer Library at  Southern Methodist University.

Publications
Most widely held works by Kelly:
 The carver's art of the Indians of northwestern California, 1930
 Ethnography of the Surprise Valley Paiute, 1932
 Excavations at Culiacán, Sinaloa , 1945
 The archaeology of the Autlán-Tuxcacuesco area of Jalisco, 1945
 Excavations at Apatzingan, Michoacan, 1947 
 The Tajin Totonac, 1952
 Folk practices in north Mexico; birth customs, folk medicine, and spiritualism in the Laguna Zone, 1965
 The Hodges Ruin : a Hohokam community in the Tucson Basin, 1978
 Ceramic sequence in Colima : Capacha, an early phase, 1980
 Isabel T. Kelly's Southern Paiute Ethnographic Field Notes, 1932-1934, Las Vegas, 2016

References

External links 
 Isabel T. Kelly Ethnographic Archive digital collection, Southern Methodist University
 Isabel T. Kelly Ethnographic Archive finding aid
 Isabel T. Kelly's Southern Paiute Ethnographic Field Notes, 1932-1934

1906 births
1982 deaths
American women anthropologists
20th-century American anthropologists
American women archaeologists
20th-century American archaeologists
University of California, Berkeley alumni
20th-century women writers
20th-century American women